Kuke (before 1997 Kukeranna) is a village in Lääneranna Parish, Pärnu County, in western Estonia.

Some parts of Estonian film "Viimne reliikvia" were filmed there.

References

 

Villages in Pärnu County